Royak Point (‘Nos Royak’ \'nos ro-'yak\) is the rocky point on the northwest coast of Sjögren Inlet in southern Trinity Peninsula, Graham Land in Antarctica.  It is formed by an offshoot of Vetrovala Peak in the southeast extremity of Aldomir Ridge, as a result of the retreat of Sjögren Glacier and Boydell Glacier in the first decade of 21st century.

The feature is named after the settlement of Royak in northeastern Bulgaria.

Location
SCAR Antarctic Digital Database mapping in 2012.

Maps
 Antarctic Digital Database (ADD). Scale 1:250000 topographic map of Antarctica. Scientific Committee on Antarctic Research (SCAR). Since 1993, regularly upgraded and updated.

References
 Royak Point. SCAR Composite Antarctic Gazetteer.
 Bulgarian Antarctic Gazetteer. Antarctic Place-names Commission. (details in Bulgarian, basic data in English)

External links
 Royak Point. Copernix satellite image

Headlands of Trinity Peninsula
Bulgaria and the Antarctic